Luciobarbus nasus is an extinct ray-finned fish species in the family Cyprinidae. It was only found in Morocco.

It inhabited habitat freshwater springs and was threatened by habitat loss.

The taxonomy and systematics of the Maghreb barbs are subject to considerable dispute. Some authors include the much more common L. magniatlantis in L. nasus, while others consider them distinct.

References

 

Luciobarbus
Endemic fauna of Morocco
Fish described in 1874
Taxa named by Albert Günther
Taxonomy articles created by Polbot